

References

History of British Columbia

Interior of British Columbia